Westville High School is a high school located in Westville, Vermilion County, Illinois, United States.  WHS is a member of the Westville Community School District #2, which also includes one grade schools, Judith Giacoma Elementary (Grades K-6) and one junior high, Westville Junior High School (Grades 7–8). Westville High School, also offers many athletic activities including Boys' And Girls' Basketball, Boys' Football, Softball, Baseball, Wrestling, And Golf.

References 

Public high schools in Illinois
Schools in Vermilion County, Illinois